The Fighting Cub is a 1925 American silent drama film directed by Paul Hurst and starring Wesley Barry, Mildred Harris, and Pat O'Malley. In 1926 it was released in Britain under the alternative title of Son o' Mine.

Synopsis
A copy boy with aspirations to be a top-level journalist manages to get a promotion to cub reporter, and soon finds himself entangled with a gang of thieves with political connections.

Cast

Preservation
A partial print of The Fighting Cub with one reel missing is held by the UCLA Film and Television Archive.

References

Bibliography
 Munden, Kenneth White. The American Film Institute Catalog of Motion Pictures Produced in the United States, Part 1. University of California Press, 1997.

External links

1925 films
1925 drama films
1920s English-language films
American silent feature films
Silent American drama films
American black-and-white films
Films directed by Paul Hurst
1920s American films